Liam Young (born 13 March 1979) is an Australian-born film director and architect. Young's work is situated within the fields of design fiction and critical design. Described by the BBC as 'The man Designing our Futures', his work explores the increasingly blurred boundaries among film, fiction, design and storytelling with the goal of prototyping and imagining the future of the city. Using speculative design, film and the visualisation of imaginary cities, he opens up conversations querying urban existence, asking provocative questions about the roles of both architecture and entertainment. Young approaches his work as an architect like a science fiction author, or futurist. Through his projects that escape traditional definitions of how an architect practices Young has caused some controversy in the architectural field and the comments section on the industry blog Archinect with his claim that "An architect's skills are completely wasted on making buildings"

Young is a founder of the Urban Futures think tank Tomorrows Thoughts Today and the nomadic research studio Unknown Fields. Young was previously a visiting Professor of Architecture at Princeton University and currently holds a position at the Architectural Association in London and runs the M.A. in Fiction and Entertainment at the Southern California Institute of Architecture with Alexey Marfin in Los Angeles.

Films

Young has developed a body of films that use new technologies of image making to tell new kinds of stories about the urban implications that these systems give rise to. Young has pioneered the use of drones and laser scanners in narrative filmmaking. In Wired Magazine's review of 3 of his films it was noted that what makes Young's sci-fi films unusual is that the technologies they focus on such as laser scanners, drones, and outsourcing are not just tools of making but are the star themselves. With his background in architecture Young's films are noted for the way the cities in which they are set become characters in themselves.

In 2016 Young released the science fiction short film Where The City Cant See The short is the first fiction film to be shot entirely using laser scanning technology (Lidar), the same vision system that driverless cars use to navigate. The story follows a group of young factory workers across a single night as they drift through a near future Detroit in a driverless taxi. They are part of an underground community that has developed new textiles for digital camouflage which they use to escape the surveillance systems of the city and seek out a hidden rave party in the abandoned industrial factories of Detroit. The film features an original soundtrack by DJ Stingray, former tour DJ for Detroit electronic band Drexciya.

Young directed In the Robot Skies the first fiction film produced using autonomous preprogrammed drones. In the film, government surveillance drones follow two characters through the towers of a future London public housing estate. Seen through the eyes of the flying cameras the film tells the story of a young woman who has hacked one of the drones and uses it to pass love letters to her boyfriend who is trapped in the tower opposite. The film premiered as part of Channel 4's Random Acts series and was awarded a Silver Palm from the 2017 Mexico International Film Festival.

In 2016 Young co produced the documentary short Consumed which received a BAFTA nomination for Best British Documentary Short. The film is a cinematic journey through the landscapes, mines, factories, and shipyards of Chinese technology production. The film reveals the hidden world behind everyday objects and re-frames the complex supply chains that fuel Western consumerism.

In 2015 Young developed the animated series New City, a series of high-resolution animated cityscapes that are exhibited as large-scale projections. Accompanying each film is a short story written by a range of science fiction authors including Jeff Noon, Tim Maughan and Pat Cadiagan. Developed from images and photographs Young collected on a series of expeditions around the world the panoramas are extrapolations of the everyday world and like much of his work create fictions from fact. Music for the series was by Coldcut.

Young's next film Renderlands, about the outsourced render farms and animation studios in India that produce most Hollywood films, was funded by the Graham Foundation and released in 2017. In 2019, he directed the film The Machine Air, which featured a scoree by Forest Swords.

Performances 

In 2014 Young collaborated with Welsh musician and composer John Cale, formerly of the Velvet Underground to develop the world first drone orchestra and the audiovisual performance LOOP >> 60 Hz: Transmissions From The Drone Orchestra. For the performance Young designed a flock of costumed drones that would fly above the audience carrying speakers that broadcast the live music played by the band. As The Guardian notes, the project "brings drones out of the realms of sinister terrorist surveillance and Amazon delivery and puts them in front of your face like massive alien gnats". In a review of the performance in The Telegraph the collaboration was described as "demented joy", a cross between an amateur airshow and a rock concert.

With British electronic producer Forest Swords Young developed In the Robot Skies, a live cinema performance of his short film of the same name. Against the backdrop of Forest Swords original soundscape and a film collage directed by Young he narrates the story of a lone drone flying across time and space. Beginning in WWI the performance tells the story of how drones have evolved across time to become the dominant infrastructure they are today. The performance premiered at the 60th London International FIlm Festival.

Publications 

Young has co authored the book Series Unknown Fields: Tales From the Dark Side of the City. The series consists of 6 books, each an illustrated story based on a field expedition through a remote landscape that is critical in the manufacture and production of contemporary technology. A number of the books have been serialised on the BBC, such as A World Adrift: South China Seas to Inner Mongolia which was developed as 3 articles exploring the landscapes of modern technologies and written in collaboration with author Tim Maughan. One of the stories focused around a radioactive lake discovered in the research of the book was part of the BBC's Best of 2015 list.

In 2014 Young edited the ebook Brave New Now a collection of specially commissioned short stories set in a fictional future city developed by Young for the 2013 Lisbon Architecture Triennale. The book features stories from science fiction authors such as Warren Ellis, Bruce Sterling, Rachel Armstrong, Samit Basu and photography by Edward Burtynsky, Charlie Koolhaas and Vincent Fournier.

Exhibitions 

Young's first US solo show opened at the Columbia University Arthur Ross Architecture Gallery in March 2017. The show was titled New Romance and featured 3 short films, each a love story set in a future city of autonomous technologies. The exhibition uses the medium of film and fiction to explore how emerging technologies are redefining human relationships and architecture. The worlds of each of the 3 films are extrapolations of the trends and weak signals of our present relationship to technology. The films present a dystopian future of ubiquitous technology but no matter how bleak the stories attempt to show that we can still imagine ways to bend technology to our will or escape from it through tiny acts of resistance.

With his nomadic studio Unknown Fields Young exhibited Unknown Fields: The Dark Side of the City at the Architectural Association Gallery in 2016. The exhibition took the form of a road trip through a collection of fragments; of drone footage, hidden camera investigations, speculative narratives and toxic objects that formed a reimagined city the size of the entire planet. The project looks at the way that the supply chains of technology is reforming landscapes all over the world. One of works in the exhibition Rare Earthenware, a set of radioactive vases made from the amount of toxic waste generated in the production of technology has since been acquired by the Victoria and Albert Museum for their ceramics collection in London.

Filmography 
 2013: Chupan Chupai (Short; producer)
 2014: New City (Video installation, director)
 2016: Where the City Can't See (Short; director)
 2016: In the Robot Skies (Short; director)
 2016: Consumed (Short; producer)
 2017: Taobao Village (Video installation; co-director with Alexey Marfin)

Interviews 
 Crane TV Interview
 Building Better Entertainment By Holly Willis for Filmmaker Magazine
 Liam Young on Speculative Architecture and Engineering the Future By Next Nature
 Arch20 Interviews Liam Young by Zack Saunders
 Liam Young is an Architect who doesn't believe in architects. Interview with Shumi Bose for Tank Magazine
 The Model is the Map, is the Territory by George Kafka for Transmediale

References

External links 
 Liam young. – Liam Young's personal website
 
 Unknown Fields. – Nomadic Research Studio Unknown Fields website
 Tomorrow's Thoughts Today- Urban Futures think tank Tomorrows Thoughts Today website

1979 births
21st-century Australian architects
Australian film directors
Living people
People educated at Brisbane State High School
Southern California Institute of Architecture faculty